Ivan Andreyevich Lukashevich (born 9 May 1991) is a Russian racing driver. He was part of the Marussia Motors driver development programme.

Career

Karting
Born in Moscow, Lukashevich competed in karting from 2001 to 2005. In 2001 and 2002 he took the Mini Class title of the Moscow Karting Championship. He also won the Russian Karting Cup in 2002.

Formula Palmer Audi
Lukashevich's next step was Formula Palmer Audi. He finished fifteenth in the championship, amassing 123 points. A second season followed in 2008, and was more successful for the Russian driver. Despite only taking part in half of the season's twenty races due to budget constraints, he secured a top ten championship finish.

Lukashevich missed the entire 2009 season due to sponsorship problems.

GP3 Series
Lukashevich stepped up to the new-for-2010 GP3 Series with Status Grand Prix.

Racing record

Career summary

 As Lukashevich was a guest driver, he was ineligible for points.

Complete GP3 Series results
(key) (Races in bold indicate pole position) (Races in italics indicate fastest lap)

References

External links
 Career statistics from Driver Database

1991 births
Living people
Russian racing drivers
Formula Ford drivers
Formula Palmer Audi drivers
Russian GP3 Series drivers
Toyota Racing Series drivers
Sportspeople from Moscow
Russian Circuit Racing Series drivers
Formula Renault Eurocup drivers
ADAC GT Masters drivers
Status Grand Prix drivers
M2 Competition drivers
Phoenix Racing drivers
GT4 European Series drivers